Cirimbel may refer to:
 Ciribul, Azerbaijan
 Dzherimbel, Azerbaijan